HMNZS Moa (T233) was a Bird class minesweeper of the Royal New Zealand Navy (RNZN) that served during World War II.

Construction and design
The first of three Bird-class minesweepers, Moa displaced 607 tons standard and 923 tons at full load. Moas main armament was a single 4-inch Mk IX naval gun, which was supplemented by anti-aircraft guns. She also carried minesweeping equipment and 40 depth charges for anti-submarine operations.

Operational history
Commissioned into the Royal New Zealand Navy on 12 August 1941, Moa was the first of two vessels with this name to serve in the RNZN and was named after a native bird from New Zealand.

At the time Moa was under the command of Lieutenant Commander Peter Phipps, later to become a vice admiral.

In February 1943, Moa participated in Operation Cleanslate, the occupation of the Russell Islands. However, when the Moa put the forces ashore, local natives informed them that the Japanese had left ten days before.

The Moa sustained two near misses and two direct hits from 500-pound bombs, one that passed through the ship before exploding in the water abeam to starboard, the other passed through the captain's cabin into the Boiler Room where it exploded, effectively 'breaking the ships back'. Moa sank bow first within about four minutes. Five ratings were killed and seven were seriously wounded, including Phipps. At some point in the interim following the sinking of the submarine I-1 and her own sinking, the Moa crew had acquired and mounted a 20 mm Oerlikon anti-aircraft gun on her very bow, with which the crew used against their attackers before they sank. This 20mm gun could still be seen on her wreck in 2002.

Postscript

Seventy-one years after her sinking, Moas name plate was recovered by divers and is being restored for eventual display at the Torpedo Bay Navy Museum in Auckland, New Zealand.  The Torpedo Bay Naval Museum already has on display the main deck gun recovered from the wreck of the I-1.

See also
 Minesweepers of the Royal New Zealand Navy

References

Further reading

External links

1941 ships
Ships built in Leith
World War II minesweepers of New Zealand
Minesweepers of the Royal New Zealand Navy
Training ships of the Royal New Zealand Navy
Maritime incidents in April 1943
Ships sunk by Japanese aircraft
Minesweepers sunk by aircraft